Lücken is a surname of German origin, originating as a patronymic from the personal name Lück. Notable people with the surname include:

Iwar von Lücken (1874-1935), German poet
J. Henry Lucken (1896-1984), American farmer and politician
Robert Lücken (born 1985), Dutch rower

See also
Lucken Farm, a bonanza farm near Portland, North Dakota
Lück